Richard Sheridan may refer to:

Richard Bingham Sheridan (1822–1897), Australian civil servant
Richard Brinsley Sheridan (1751–1816), Irish playwright
Richard Brinsley Sheridan (politician) (1806–1888), Irish politician

See also
Dick Sheridan, American football coach and college athletics administrator